The Brooklyn Arcadians were an American basketball team based in Brooklyn, New York, that was a member of the American Basketball League. The team was named after Arcadia Hall, where they played their home games. The team was replaced by the New York Celtics five games into their final season.

Year-by-year

Notable players

Tubby Raskin (1902–1981), basketball player and coach

References

Basketball teams in New York City
Sports in Brooklyn